Zenobiellina subrufescens is a species of small air-breathing land snail, a pulmonate gastropod mollusk in the family Hygromiidae.

Description
For terms see gastropod shell

The 4-6 x 6-10 mm shell has 4.5-5 convex whorls with moderate suture. It is slightly shouldered above the periphery, the aperture is usually without a lip inside and the umbilicus is very narrow, and partly covered by the reflected columellar margin. The shell is pale brown, very finely striated, thin and transparent.

Distribution
This species is known to occur in:
 Great Britain and Ireland
 France
 Spain

Life cycle
The size of the egg is 1.5 × 1 mm.

References

External links
 Miller J.S. (1822). A list of the freshwater and landshells occurring in the environment of Bristol, with observations. Annals of Philosophy. new ser., 3(5): 376-381
Zenobiella subrufescens at Animalbase taxonomy,short description, distribution, biology,status (threats), images 
Fauna Europaea Search Distribution

 

Hygromiidae
Gastropods described in 1822